William Smith Herndon (November 27, 1835 – October 11, 1903) was a U.S. Representative from Texas.

Biography
Herndon was born in Rome, Georgia, and moved to Wood County, Texas, in May 1852.  He attended the common schools and graduated from McKenzie College in 1859.  He then studied law, attained admission to the bar in 1860 and commenced practice in Tyler, Texas.

He served as a member of the Confederate States Army during the American Civil War; he enlisted in 1861, and attained the rank of captain before being discharged in 1865.

After the war, Herndon resumed the practice of law in Tyler, and became counsel, executive advisor, and general solicitor for several railroads.

Herndon was elected as a Democrat to the Forty-second and Forty-third Congresses (March 4, 1871 – March 3, 1875).  He was an unsuccessful candidate for reelection in 1874 to the Forty-fourth Congress.

Following his service in Congress, Herndon resumed practicing law in Tyler. He died in Albuquerque, New Mexico, October 11, 1903, and was interred at Oakwood Cemetery in Tyler.

References
 Retrieved on March 24, 2010

1835 births
1903 deaths
People from Rome, Georgia
People from Wood County, Texas
People from Tyler, Texas
Confederate States Army officers
Texas lawyers
Democratic Party members of the United States House of Representatives from Texas
19th-century American politicians
Military personnel from Texas